Lee Chang-min (born May 1, 1986), most often credited as Changmin, is a South Korean singer. He studied at Dong-ah Institute of Media and Arts and is the oldest member of the K-pop group 2AM. He was also a member of duo Homme, along with Lee Hyun.

Discography

Extended plays

Singles

Soundtrack appearances

Filmography

Television

Musical theatre

Radio

Awards and nominations

Music programs

Music Bank

Personal life
Lee is a devout Roman Catholic.

References

External links 

1986 births
Living people
2AM (band) members
Dong-ah Institute of Media and Arts alumni
Hybe Corporation artists
JYP Entertainment artists
Musicians from Seoul
South Korean male idols
South Korean pop singers
South Korean Roman Catholics
21st-century South Korean male singers